Roberta Morris Purdee (born September 3, in Kansas City, Missouri) is an American film producer and documentarian. She is the wife of actor Nathan Purdee and mother of actor/director Taylor A. Purdee.

Personal life
Raised by single mother Nancy Kopplin Morris throughout the midwestern United States, Morris Purdee would become a member of the first graduating class of Columbine High School, graduating early. In her late teens she married future daytime TV icon Nathan Purdee, the two supported themselves through college (where she studied early childhood education) by working as bounty hunters in Denver, Colorado. Eventually moving to Los Angeles so that Purdee could pursue a career as an actor, the two divorced in the 1980s only to remarry again in 1991, moving to New York City to begin Purdee's tenure on One Life to Live and raise their newborn son Taylor A. Purdee. She currently resides in Pennsylvania with her husband.

Career
Moving to Los Angeles Morris Purdee began working as assistant to Academy Award winning actor/director Lee Grant. Spending the next few years assisting Grant and fellow Oscar nominee Brenda Vaccaro, she became a script reader within the Hollywood Studio System before moving to New York to work as production coordinator on a number of studio films, independent films, television films, and documentaries.

Continuing to work with Grant and husband Joseph Feury she began producing films eventually opening her own production company with her own husband Nathan Purdee. The two groups worked together on a number of acclaimed documentaries and controversial narrative films for HBO, Lifetime, PBS, and Disney.

In the late 90s Purdee's Karmic Release Ltd. began to strike out on its own, producing the documentary film Wallowitch & Ross: This Moment, an intimate, musical portrait of New York Cabaret legend John Wallowitch and partner Bertram Ross, who had been Martha Graham's star dancer and co-director of the Graham Company. Directed by her brother Richard Morris and crediting both his wife, costume designer Sue Gandy and Nathan Purdee as producers as well, Wallowitch & Ross: This Moment went on to be shortlisted for the 1999 Academy Award for Best Documentary Feature.

Re-teaming with Feury/Grant in the early 2000s Morris Purdee produced "...A Father...A Son...Once Upon a Time in Hollywood", the story of the Douglas Hollywood dynasty begun by Kirk Douglas, and the groundbreaking Baghdad ER for HBO which went on to win 4 Emmys, a Peabody, and the Dupont-Columbia.

During this particularly productive era Morris Purdee also produced a series of specials for Sesame Workshop, the beloved documentary Praying with Lior, as well as working with Jonathan Caouette on his seminal film Tarnation. Her solutions to the political and logistical struggles faced while producing Baghdad ER and the extensive roadblocks faced when clearing rights to the near endless pop culture imagery that is woven into the fabric of Tarnation have been lectured on at Yale and Lehigh University.

In 2011 she began working more closely with son Taylor A. Purdee. The two have produced two feature length films together, the documentary This is Honduras, and the musical film Killian & the Comeback Kids which stars both Taylor and Nathan Purdee, as well as a number of acclaimed specials, shorts, and re-releases. The features, both directed by Taylor, are expected to be released theatrically in 2020.

In 2014 Blue Rider Press published Lee Grant's memoirs as I Said Yes To Everything, edited by Morris Purdee. The two had begun work on the book in 2009. Receiving rave reviews the book has seen multiple printings and been placed on the Entertainment Weekly "Must List," Apple's "Best of 2014," been named an Editor's Favorite book by Amazon.

References

1957 births
Living people
Film producers from Kansas
American women film producers
People from Kansas City, Missouri
21st-century American women